Montenegrins are a South Slavic people who are primarily associated with the modern-day state of Montenegro. They form an ethnic minority in Kosovo.

The Montenegrins were primarily concentrated in the municipalities of Peć, Pristina, Kosovska Mitrovica, Istok, Deçan, and Gjakova, until 1961. In the period from 1961–1981, the Montenegrins disappeared from 243 settlements, which, combined with the 760 settlements that had no Montenegrin inhabitants in 1961, gives a total of 1,003 settlements without a single Montenegrin inhabitant. As a result of conflicts with the ethnically dominant Albanians, many Montenegrins moved from Kosovo to Montenegro or to Serbia proper.

In December 2008, the Republic of Kosovo recognized the Montenegrin national minority in Kosovo.

Demographics 
1948 census - 28,050 (3.9%)
1953 census - 31,343 (3.9%)
1961 census - 37,588 (3.9%)
Peć - 12,701 (33.8%)
1971 census - 31,555 (2.5%)
1981 census - 27,028 (1.7%)
1991 census - 20,365 (1%)
1995 unofficial estimate - around 7,000 (0.3%)

See also 
Albanians in Kosovo
Bosniaks in Kosovo
Serbs of Kosovo

Notes

References 

Petrović, Ruža and Marina Blagojević (June 7, 1988) "The Migration of Serbs and Montenegrins from Kosovo", SANU, Department of Social Studies. Reproduced. Accessed September 3, 2007.

Ethnic groups in Kosovo
Kosovo